This is a list of Members of Parliament (MPs) who held seats at the end of the 57th Parliament of the United Kingdom who announced they would not stand for reelection in the 2019 general election.

Former Labour MP John Mann (Bassetlaw) and Speaker of the House of Commons John Bercow (Buckingham) are not included in this list as they resigned on 28 October and 4 November 2019, respectively, meaning that their seats were vacant at dissolution.

List of MPs

A total of  members announced their decision not to stand for re-election:

Notes

References

2019 United Kingdom general election
Lists of UK MPs 2017–2019